John O. Williams may refer to:
 John Osborn Williams (1886–1963), Canadian businessperson
 John Overton Williams (1905–1996), American jazz saxophonist
 John Owen Williams (Pedrog) (1853–1932), Welsh Congregational minister and poet
 John Owen Williams (record producer) (born 1951), English A&R executive and record producer

See also 
 John Williams (disambiguation)
 John Owen Williams (disambiguation)